FRIGID New York (formerly the Horse Trade Theater Group) was founded in 1998 in the East Village neighborhood of Manhattan, New York City. It is located at 85 East 4th Street between Second Avenue and The Bowery. The two theaters in the group are the Kraine Theater and UNDER St. Marks.  These theaters are the artistic homes to the many Off-Off Broadway theatre artists involved with FRIGID as resident artists and guest artists.

In 2015, the Horse Trade Theater Group/Fire This Time Festival won the Obie Grant at the Obie Awards presented by the American Theater Wing.

FRIGID New York is home to a number of yearly festivals including the Fire This Time Festival, the FRIGID New York Fringe Festival, Estrogenius, Queerly, the Little Shakespeare Festival, Days of the Dead, the Gotham Storytelling Festival, FunnYmmigrants, and Burlesque Blitz.

References

Notes

Off-Off-Broadway
Theatres in Manhattan
1988 establishments in New York City
East Village, Manhattan